Twisted Showcase is a British independent web television series, created by Robin Bell and Rhys Jones. It is described as a mixture of self-contained horror, sci-fi, psychological thriller, and comedy.

Production
Twisted Showcase was created by Bell and Jones who wanted to make something different with a strong focus on story. They both write for the series and are producers of the show. Each episode is a standalone story which aims to shock, amaze and entertain.

A third series was produced for 2014 with episodes featuring Red Dwarf actor Norman Lovett and Torchwood and Doctor Who star Gareth David-Lloyd.

A fourth series was slated for release in 2016 with an episode called "Muscle Memory" written by Debbie Moon and an episode featuring Gareth David-Lloyd's directorial debut. The fourth season did not end up premiering until October 2017 with the episode, "Be My Head."

Reception
Twisted Showcase was recognized in 2012 when it was named in The Guardian top 25 must watch web shows, the only British series in the top 25.

References

External links
Official Youtube channel

2012 British television series debuts
British comedy web series
English-language television shows
Science fiction web series